The 4th Madras Native Infantry could refer to the: 

1st Battalion which became the 64th Pioneers
2nd Battalion which became the 75th Carnatic Infantry